The Dublin Bay 21 footer yacht is a one-design wooden sailing boat designed for sailing in Dublin Bay.

The seven yachts were designed by Alfred Mylne and built between 1903 and 1906 under a commission from Dublin Bay Sailing Club to encourage inexpensive one-design racing in recognition of the success of the Water Wag one-design of 1887 and the Colleen Class of 1897. They may be the oldest class of racing keelboat yacht in the world.

The first race took place on 19 June 1903 in Dublin Bay.

List of boats
The seven sisters

 Innisfallen built by Hollwey, 1903.
 Maureen built by Hollwey, 1903.
 Estelle built by Hollwey, 1903.
 Garavogue built by Kelly, 1903.
 Oola built by Kelly, 1905.
 Naneen built by Clancy, 1905.
 Geraldine built by Hollwey, 1908.

The class is now being restored following a long period out of service when the fleet lay in various states of disrepair in Jack Tyrrell's boatyard in Arklow, Co. Wicklow. The fleet were taken out of the water in 1986 after Hurricane Charley ruined active Dublin Bay 21 fleet racing in August of that year. Two 21s sank in the storm, suffering the same fate as their sister ship Estelle four years earlier.

Currently Naneen, Garavogue, Estelle and Geraldine are restored and back on the water. Oola is under restoration while the frames are constructed for Maureen and Inisfallen who will hopefully be back on the water shortly.  

It is said that these boats present one of the loveliest sights to be seen on any sailing waters in the world.

Dimensions 
Overall length- 32'-6'

Beam- 7'-6"

Keel lead- 2 tons.

Sail area- 600sq.ft.

Change of rig 
In 1964, some of the owners thought that the boats were outdated, and needed a new breath of fresh air. After extensive discussions between all the owners, the gaff rig and timber mast was abandoned in favour of a more fashionable Bermudan rig with an aluminium mast. Unfortunately, this rig put previously unseen loads on the hulls, resulting in some permanent damage.

References 

Keelboats